Christmas beer is a seasonal beer brewed for consumption at Christmas. They are usually strong and spiced with a variety of ingredients including cinnamon, orange peel, cloves and vanilla.

Examples

 Belgian Christmas beers
 British Winter Warmers
 French Biere de Noel
 Danish and Norwegian julebryg or juleøl
 German Weihnachtsbier
Brouwerij De Ranke Père Noël (Belgium)
 Corsendonk Christmas Ale (Belgium)
 Damm's Christmas Beer (Spain)
 Great Lakes Brewing Company Christmas Ale (USA)
 Harpoon Brewery Winter Warmer (USA)
 Great Basin Brewing Company Red Nose Holiday Wassail. (USA)
 Saint Arnold Christmas Ale (USA)
 St. Feuillien Christmas Beer (Belgium)
 Tuborg Christmas Brew (Europe)

See also
 Barley wine
 Old ale

References

External links

Types of beer
Christmas food